Ivangorod is a town in Kingiseppsky District of Leningrad Oblast, Russia, located on the east bank of the Narva river which flows along the Estonia–Russia international border,  west of St. Petersburg. The town's population was recorded as 

Ivangorod is a major border crossing point and a railway station by the Tallinn–St. Petersburg line. It is located just opposite to the Estonian town of Narva. The town is the site of the Ivangorod Fortress, a prominent fortification monument of the 15th and the 16th centuries.

History

The fortress, established in 1492 during the reign of Ivan III of Moscow, took its name (literally: Ivan-town — gorod in Russian means "town" or "city") from that of the Tsar. Between 1581 and 1590 and from 1612 to 1704, Sweden controlled the area. Ivangorod was granted town privileges and administered as a Russian township under the Swedish Empire (who conquered it in 1612 from boyar Teuvo Aminev) until 1649, when its burghers were ordered to remove to a Narva suburb. In 1617 Russia and Sweden signed the Treaty of Stolbovo, which placed the area under Swedish sovereignty. Russia reconquered it during the Great Northern War in 1704. Despite other changes in territory and sovereignty, Ivangorod was considered an administrative part of the town of Narva from 1649 until 1945. In 1780, Ivangorod, together with Narva, was included into Narvsky Uyezd of St. Petersburg Governorate. In 1796, Narvsky Uyezd was abolished and merged into Yamburgsky Uyezd. 

In July 1917, Narva district, including Ivangorod, voted in referendum to join recently formed Autonomous Governorate of Estonia. The city was captured by the Imperial German Army during World War I after the Russian Army abandoned the local fortress. During the Estonian War of Independence (1918–1920), the newly independent Republic of Estonia established control over the whole of Narva, including Ivangorod, in January 1919, a move which Soviet Russia recognized in the 1920 Treaty of Tartu. In January 1945 Soviet authorities defined the Narva river as the border between the Estonian SSR and Russian SFSR, and as a result the administration of Ivangorod transferred from Narva to the Kingiseppsky District of Leningrad Oblast. Having grown in population, Ivangorod gained town status on October 28, 1954.

After the restoration of Estonian independence in 1991, there have been some disputes about the Estonian-Russian border in the Narva area, as the new constitution of Estonia (adopted in 1992) recognizes the 1920 Treaty of Tartu border to be currently legal. The Russian Federation, however, regards Estonia as a successor of the Estonian SSR and recognizes the 1945 border between two former national republics. Officially, Estonia has no territorial claims in the area, which is also reflected in the new Estonian-Russian border treaty, according to which Ivangorod remains a part of Russia. Although the Estonian Foreign Minister Urmas Paet and Russian Foreign Minister Sergey Lavrov signed the treaty in 2005, due to continuing political tensions it has not been ratified.

Administrative and municipal status
Within the framework of administrative divisions, it is, together with two rural localities, incorporated within Kingiseppsky District as Ivangorodskoye Settlement Municipal Formation. As a municipal division, Ivangorodskoye Settlement Municipal Formation is incorporated within Kingiseppsky Municipal District as Ivangorodskoye Urban Settlement.

Restricted access
The town of Ivangorod is included into the border security zone, intended to protect the borders of Russia from unwanted activity. In order to visit the zone, a permit issued by the local Federal Security Service department or a valid Schengen visa is required. An EU passport with a Russian visa is also valid (2016).

Economy

Industry

Ivangorod has enterprises of textile, food, and timber industries, as well as a plant producing metallic plants and reservoirs. The Narva Hydroelectric Station is located in the town limits as well.

Transportation
The railway connecting St. Petersburg with Tallinn passes through Ivangorod. There is infrequent suburban service to Baltiysky railway station of St. Petersburg, as well as passenger service to Tallinn.

The A180 Highway connects St. Petersburg and Ivangorod. It coincides with the European route E20 connecting St. Petersburg via Tallinn with Shannon Airport.

Culture

Ivangorod contains thirty-three cultural heritage monuments of federal significance and additionally seven objects classified as cultural and historical heritage of local significance. All federal monuments are related to the Ivangorod Fortress. The fortress functions as a museum.

Twin towns and sister cities

Ivangorod is twinned with:
  Karlskoga Municipality, Sweden
  Narva, Estonia
  Kamienna Góra, Poland (until 2022)

References

Notes

Sources

External links

 Official website of Ivangorod 
 Ivangorod Business Directory 
 Photo gallery

Cities and towns in Leningrad Oblast
Kingiseppsky District
Yamburgsky Uyezd
Ingria
Estonia–Russia border crossings